Stay Tuned was a Canadian comedy television series which aired on CBC Television from 1976 to 1977.

Premise
This live comedy series began once the Hockey Night in Canada broadcast concluded and continued until 11:00 p.m., the start of The National. Material was tailored to the available time slot. For example, the debut episode ran 9½ minutes.  Its regular cast was Jayne Eastwood, Ben Gordon, Eugene Levy, and Mary Ann McDonald. Guests included the Homemade Theatre troupe, John Kastner and Nancy White.

The series was originally titled Fourth Period.

Scheduling
This series was broadcast Saturdays approximately 10:30 p.m. to 11:00 p.m. (Eastern) following Hockey Night in Canada from 9 October 1976 to 1 January 1977.

References

External links
 
 

CBC Television original programming
1976 Canadian television series debuts
1977 Canadian television series endings